Elliot Weintrob (born March 2, 1965 in Washington, D.C.) is an American slalom canoeist who competed in the early-to-mid 1990s in the C2 class together with Martin McCormick. He finished 15th in the C2 event at the 1992 Summer Olympics in Barcelona.

World Cup individual podiums

References

Sports-Reference.com profile

1965 births
American male canoeists
Canoeists at the 1992 Summer Olympics
Living people
Olympic canoeists of the United States
Sportspeople from Washington, D.C.